The following are the statistics for the 2012 CECAFA Cup, which took place in Kampala, Uganda from 24 November to 8 December 2012. All statistics are correct as of 20:00 UTC+3 on 8 December 2012. Goals scored from penalty shoot-outs are not counted.

Goalscorers

5 goals

  John Bocco
  Mrisho Ngassa
  Robert Ssentongo

3 goals

  Selemani Ndikumana
  Christophe Nduwarugira
  Chiukepo Msowoya
  Geoffrey Kizito
  Brian Umony
  Khamis Mcha Khamis

2 goals

  Clifton Miheso
  David Ochieng
  Mike Baraza
  Dady Birori

1 goal

  Yusuf Ndikumana
  Yosief Ghide
  Hermon Tecleab
  Yonathan Kebede
  Elias Mamo
  Edwin Lavatsa
  Rama Salim
  Ndaziona Chatsalira
  Miciam Mhone
  Jean-Baptiste Mugiraneza
  Haruna Niyonzima
  Tumaine Ntamuhanga
  Jabril Hassan Mohammed
  Farid Mohamed Najeeb
  Mwinyi Kazimoto
  Amri Kiemba
  Hamis Kizza
  Emmanuel Okwi
  Aggrey Morris
  Abdallah Othman

Scoring

Wins and losses

Disciplinary record

By match

By referee

By team

By individual

Overall statistics
Bold numbers indicate the maximum values in each column.

See also
 2012 CECAFA Cup scorers
 2012 CECAFA Cup schedule

References

statistics